Tokyo Blade is the debut album by English heavy metal band Tokyo Blade. It was originally released in 1983 and reissued by High Vaultage Records in a remastered edition on CD in 1997, including all the 4 tracks from the 1984 Midnight Rendezvous EP, which actually were recorded in early 1983 while the band was called Genghis Khan plus "Death On Main Street" which was originally the b-side on "Powergame" 7" and recorded at the same sessions as the album.

Track listings
Side one
"Powergame" (Andy Boulton, Al Marsh) – 4:12
"Break the Chains" (Boulton, Marsh, John Wiggins) – 5:07
"If Heaven Is Hell" (Boulton, Marsh) – 6:04
"On Through the Night" (Boulton, Marsh) – 7:29

Side two
"Killer City" (Boulton, Marsh) – 5:47
"Liar" (Boulton, Marsh) – 5:37
"Tonight" (Russ Ballard) – 4:02
"Sunrise in Tokyo" (Boulton, Marsh) – 5:47
"Blue Ridge Mountains of Virginia" – 1:13

1997 remastered edition
"Powergame" – 4:12
"Break the Chains" – 5:07
"If Heaven Is Hell" – 6:04
"On Through the Night" – 7:29
"Killer City" – 5:47
"Liar" – 5:37
"Tonight" – 4:02
"Sunrise in Tokyo" – 5:47
"Blue Ridge Mountains of Virginia" – 1:13
"If Heaven Is Hell" – 6:00
"Highway Passion" – 4:24
"Midnight Rendezvous" – 3:22
"Mean Streak" – 4:44
"Death on Main Street" – 4:38

Personnel

Tokyo Blade
 Alan Marsh – lead vocals
 Andy Boulton – guitar
 John Wiggins – guitar (except tracks 3, 10-13)
 Andy Robbins – bass guitar
 Steve Pierce – drums

Additional musicians
Ray Dismore – guitar on tracks 3,10-13.

Production
 Kevin D. Nixon – producer
 Ralph Jezzard – engineer
 Tony Spath – mixing
 Andy Allen – producer, engineer and mixing of tracks 3, 10-13.

References 

Tokyo Blade albums
1983 debut albums